Olivier Guyon (born 1975) is a French-American astronomer.  He is an Astronomer in Steward Observatory of the College of Science and Professor in the James C. Wyant College of Optical Sciences, both of The University of Arizona. He is the SCExAO Project Scientist at the Subaru Telescope. Guyon was awarded a MacArthur Fellowship in 2012.

Guyon designs telescopes and other astronomical instrumentation that aid in the search for exoplanets planets outside the Solar System.  Specifically, coronagraphs and extreme adaptive optics.

References

External links
Oliver Guyon website at the Subaru Telescope

University of Arizona faculty
MacArthur Fellows
Living people
21st-century American physicists
Pierre and Marie Curie University alumni
French physicists
1975 births